IPEC can refer to:
 Indian Point Energy Center
 International Programme on the Elimination of Child Labour
 Institute of Permaculture and Ecovillage of the Cerrado, Brazil
 Intellectual Property Enterprise Court, a venue for legal actions relating to Intellectual Property in the United Kingdom 
 International Pharmaceutical Excipients Council
 International Symposium on Parameterized and Exact Computation, an annual computer science conference
 Toll Ipec, an Australian logistics enterprise, subsidiary of Toll Group

See also

 Ipek (disambiguation)